Marcel Ivan Arcenal Ouano (born March 6, 2000) is a Filipino footballer who plays as a forward for Philippines Football League club United City.

Collegiate career
Ouano played for the football team of his college, National University in the UAAP.

Club career

Azkals Development Team
In 2020, he joined the Azkals Development Team, a guest team in the Philippines Football League mainly composed of the Philippines international youth players. He made his league debut for ADT in a 1–0 defeat against the defending champions United City.

United City
After his 2-year stint with ADT, Ouano joined United City. He scored his first goal for the club in a 4–0 win against Maharlika Manila in the 2022 Copa Paulino Alcantara. A week later, he scored his second goal in a 4–0 win against his former club ADT.

On 15 April 2022, Ouano made his AFC Champions League debut in a 0–1 defeat against Jeonnam Dragons, coming in as a substitute replacing Ricardo Sendra at the 83rd minute of the match.

International career

Philippines U17
In 2016, Ouano was included in the 23-man squad for the 2016 AFF U-16 Youth Championship held in Phnom Penh, Cambodia. He made his debut for the Philippines U16 in a 1–0 defeat against Singapore U17.

Philippines U19
In 2017, Ouano was called up to represent the Philippines U19 in the 2017 AFF U-19 Youth Championship. He made his debut for the Philippines U19 in a 3–2 defeat against Brunei U19.

Philippines U23
Ouano was named in the reserves list of the Philippines U-22 squad that competed in the 2019 Southeast Asian Games held in the Philippines. In 2021, Ouano was included in the 23-man squad for the 2022 AFC U-23 Asian Cup qualification matches against South Korea, Singapore and Timor Leste. He made his debut for the Philippines U23 in a 1–0 defeat against Singapore U23, coming in as a substitute replacing Mark Winhoffer at the 59th minute. Ouano scored his first and second goal for the Philippines U23 in a 2–2 draw against Timor Leste U23 in the 2022 AFF U-23 Youth Championship held in Cambodia.

Career statistics

Club

References

External links
 
 
 

2000 births
Living people
Cebuano people
People from Cebu City
People from Cebu
Filipino sportspeople
Filipino footballers
Azkals Development Team players
University Athletic Association of the Philippines footballers
Philippines youth international footballers
Association football forwards
Competitors at the 2019 Southeast Asian Games
Visayan people
Southeast Asian Games competitors for the Philippines